is a passenger railway station in the city of Jōsō, Ibaraki Prefecture, Japan operated by the private railway company Kantō Railway.

Lines

Station layout
The station consists one side platform and one island platform connected by a level crossing. The station was originally the head office of the Jōsō Railway.

Platforms

Adjacent stations

History
Mitsukaidō Station was opened on 1 November 1913 as a station on the Jōsō Railroad, which became the Kantō Railway in 1965. The station building was rebuilt in 1973.

Passenger statistics
In fiscal 2017, the station was used by an average of 2974 passengers daily).

Surrounding area
 Mitsukaidō Post Office
 former Mitsukaidō City Hall

See also
 List of railway stations in Japan

References

External links

  Kantō Railway Station Information 

Railway stations in Ibaraki Prefecture
Railway stations in Japan opened in 1913